In mathematics, de Rham cohomology (named after Georges de Rham) is a tool belonging both to algebraic topology and to differential topology, capable of expressing basic topological information about smooth manifolds in a form particularly adapted to computation and the concrete representation of cohomology classes. It is a cohomology theory based on the existence of differential forms with prescribed properties.

On any smooth manifold, every exact form is closed, but the converse may fail to hold. Roughly speaking, this failure is related to the possible existence of "holes" in the manifold, and the de Rham cohomology groups comprise a set of topological invariants of smooth manifolds that precisely quantify this relationship.

Definition
The de Rham complex is the cochain complex of differential forms on some smooth manifold , with the exterior derivative as the differential:

In contrast, closed forms are not necessarily exact. Removing one point of the circle obviates this, at the same time changing the topology of the manifold. 

One prominent example when all closed forms are exact is when the underlying space is contractible to a point, i.e., it is simply connected (no-holes condition). In this case the exterior derivative  restricted to closed forms has a local inverse called a homotopy operator. Since it is also nilpotent, it forms a dual chain complex with the arrows reversed compared to the de Rham complex. This is the situation described in the Poincaré lemma. 

The idea behind de Rham cohomology is to define equivalence classes of closed forms on a manifold. One classifies two closed forms  as cohomologous if they differ by an exact form, that is, if  is exact. One then defines the -th de Rham cohomology group  to be the set of equivalence classes, that is, the set of closed forms in  modulo the exact forms.

Note that, for any manifold  composed of  disconnected components, each of which is connected, we have that

De Rham cohomology computed
One may often find the general de Rham cohomologies of a manifold using the above fact about the zero cohomology and a Mayer–Vietoris sequence. Another useful fact is that the de Rham cohomology is a homotopy invariant. While the computation is not given, the following are the computed de Rham cohomologies for some common topological objects:

The -sphere
For the -sphere, and also when taken together with a product of open intervals, we have the following. Let , and  be an open real interval. Then

The -torus
The -torus is the Cartesian product: . Similarly, allowing  here, we obtain

We can also find explicit generators for the de Rham cohomology of the torus directly using differential forms. Also, the pullback is an injective morphism. In our case of  the differential forms  are -invariant since . This with injectivity implies that

Punctured Euclidean space
Punctured Euclidean space is simply  with the origin removed.

The Möbius strip
We may deduce from the fact that the Möbius strip, can be deformation retracted to the -sphere (i.e. the real unit circle), that:

De Rham's theorem
Stokes' theorem is an expression of duality between de Rham cohomology and the homology of chains. It says that the pairing of differential forms and chains, via integration, gives a homomorphism from de Rham cohomology  to singular cohomology groups  De Rham's theorem, proved by Georges de Rham in 1931, states that for a smooth manifold , this map is in fact an isomorphism.

More precisely, consider the map

defined as follows: for any , let  be the element of  that acts as follows:

The theorem of de Rham asserts that this is an isomorphism between de Rham cohomology and singular cohomology.

The exterior product endows the direct sum of these groups with a ring structure. A further result of the theorem is that the two cohomology rings are isomorphic (as graded rings), where the analogous product on singular cohomology is the cup product.

Sheaf-theoretic de Rham isomorphism
For any smooth manifold M, let  be the constant sheaf on M associated to the abelian group ; in other words,  is the sheaf of locally constant real-valued functions on M. Then we have a natural isomorphism

(Note that this shows that de Rham cohomology may also be computed in terms of Čech cohomology; indeed, since every smooth manifold is paracompact Hausdorff we have that sheaf cohomology is isomorphic to the Čech cohomology  for any good cover  of M.)

Proof
In more detail, let m be the dimension of M and let  denote the sheaf of germs of -forms on M (with  the sheaf of  functions on M). By the Poincaré lemma, the following sequence of sheaves is exact (in the abelian category of sheaves):

This long exact sequence now breaks up into short exact sequences of sheaves

where by exactness we have isomorphisms  for all k. Each of these induces a long exact sequence in cohomology. Since the sheaf  of  functions on M admits partitions of unity, any -module is a fine sheaf; in particular, the sheaves  are all fine. Therefore, the sheaf cohomology groups  vanish for  since all fine sheaves on paracompact spaces are acyclic. So the long exact cohomology sequences themselves ultimately separate into a chain of isomorphisms.

Related ideas
The de Rham cohomology has inspired many mathematical ideas, including Dolbeault cohomology, Hodge theory, and the Atiyah–Singer index theorem. However, even in more classical contexts, the theorem has inspired a number of developments. Firstly, the Hodge theory proves that there is an isomorphism between the cohomology consisting of harmonic forms and the de Rham cohomology consisting of closed forms modulo exact forms. This relies on an appropriate definition of harmonic forms and of the Hodge theorem. For further details see Hodge theory.

Harmonic forms

If  is a compact Riemannian manifold, then each equivalence class in  contains exactly one harmonic form. That is, every member  of a given equivalence class of closed forms can be written as

Any harmonic function on a compact connected Riemannian manifold is a constant. Thus, this particular representative element can be understood to be an extremum (a minimum) of all cohomologously equivalent forms on the manifold. For example, on a -torus, one may envision a constant -form as one where all of the "hair" is combed neatly in the same direction (and all of the "hair" having the same length). In this case, there are two cohomologically distinct combings; all of the others are linear combinations. In particular, this implies that the 1st Betti number of a -torus is two. More generally, on an -dimensional torus , one can consider the various combings of -forms on the torus.

More precisely, for a differential manifold , one may equip it with some auxiliary Riemannian metric. Then the Laplacian  is defined by

 
with  the exterior derivative and  the codifferential. The Laplacian is a homogeneous (in grading) linear differential operator acting upon the exterior algebra of differential forms: we can look at its action on each component of degree  separately.

If  is compact and oriented, the dimension of the kernel of the Laplacian acting upon the space of -forms is then equal (by Hodge theory) to that of the de Rham cohomology group in degree : the Laplacian picks out a unique harmonic form in each cohomology class of closed forms.

Hodge decomposition
Let  be a compact oriented Riemannian manifold.  The Hodge decomposition states that any -form on  uniquely splits into the sum of three  components:

One says that a form  is co-closed if  and co-exact if  for some form , and that  is harmonic if the Laplacian is zero, . This follows by noting that exact and co-exact forms are orthogonal; the orthogonal complement then consists of forms that are both closed and co-closed: that is, of harmonic forms. Here, orthogonality is defined with respect to the  inner product on :

By use of Sobolev spaces or distributions, the decomposition can be extended for example to a complete (oriented or not) Riemannian manifold.

See also
 Hodge theory
 Integration along fibers (for de Rham cohomology, the pushforward is given by integration)
 Sheaf theory
 -lemma for a refinement of exact differential forms in the case of compact Kähler manifolds.

Citations

References

External links 

 Idea of the De Rham Cohomology in Mathifold Project
 

Cohomology theories
Differential forms